Australia's Own is a 1919 Australian silent film set in New Guinea, with footage shot in the Yule Island area near Port Moresby. It is a lost film.

The title refers to the transfer of New Guinea from being a German possession to an Australian colony.

Plot
In New Guinea, a young ex-Anzac officer and his girlfriend come into conflict with a German settler, Carl, who is trying to steal the woman's right to an oil well.

Cast
Nellie Romer
Garry Gordon as Anzac soldier
J.E. Ward as Carl Hickmann

Production
J.E. Ward was a sketch artist on the staff of The Sydney Morning Herald who travelled extensively in Papua, shooting thousands of feet of footage. On the suggestions of Dan Carroll he decided to add some dramatic narrative to his footage, and in mid-1918 shot some scenes with actors Nellie Romer and Garry Gordon on Yule Island.

Catholic missionaries complained about the filming and territory administrators impounded the footage on the grounds the film might hurt relations with the native population. Ward appealed and the footage was released.

Reception
The film was advertised as "The motion picture sensation that the Government of Papua banned."

It does not appear to have been a success. However, Ward later released several more documentaries with a Papuan background, including The Quest for the Blue Bird of Paradise (1923) and Death Devils in Paradise (1924), as well as the comedy, Those Terrible Twins (1925).

References

External links

Australia's Own at National Film and Sound Archive

1919 films
Australian drama films
Australian black-and-white films
Australian silent films
Lost Australian films
1919 drama films
Films set in Papua New Guinea
Silent drama films